Cricket Wales is the national governing body of cricket in Wales.

It is an umbrella partnership body comprising the Welsh Cricket Association, Glamorgan County Cricket Club, Wales National County Cricket Club, the Welsh Schools Cricket Association and Sport Wales. It regulates the sport of cricket in Wales and organises competitions up to national level.

Cricket Wales is based at the SWALEC Stadium, Sophia Gardens, Cardiff.

It is affiliated with the England and Wales Cricket Board and is one of its Cricket Boards, alongside the English counties. The ECB Association of Cricket Officials (ACO) has (alongside Cricket Wales) also a single association for Wales, which is one of five regional bodies (in England & Wales).

See also
Cricket in Wales

References

External links
Cricket Wales Official Website
Exercises To Improve Cricket Skills

Sports governing bodies in Wales
Wales
Cricket administration in Wales
Organisations based in Cardiff